The Coryton Line is a commuter railway line in Cardiff from the city centre to Heath, Birchgrove, Rhiwbina, Whitchurch and Coryton.  It was originally opened as part of the main line of the Cardiff Railway.

The line is operated by Transport for Wales as part of the Valley Lines network. TfW replaced the previous franchise, Arriva Trains Wales in October 2018. Rolling stock seen operating the line are normally class 153s, class 150s or even 158s.

Services normally continue to Radyr via the City Line and then back towards Coryton.

Electrification of the Line
On 16 July 2012 plans to electrify the line were announced by the Government as part of a £9.4bn package of investment of the railways in England and Wales.

The announcement was made as an extension of the electrification of the South Wales Main Line from Cardiff to Swansea and the electrification of the south Wales Valley Lines at a total cost of £350 million. The investment will require new trains and should result in reduced journey times and cheaper maintenance of the network. Work was expected to start between 2014 and 2019, but was then pushed back to between 2019 and 2024.

However, as part of Welsh Government's South Wales Metro this line has been taken over, and will soon be electrified in preparation for new Class 756 rolling stock.

See also
List of railway stations in Cardiff

References

External links 

Rail transport in Cardiff
Railway lines in Wales
Standard gauge railways in Wales